The Masked Singer Brasil is a Brazilian reality singing competition television series based on the South Korean television series King of Mask Singer. The series premiered on August 10, 2021 on TV Globo.

The series features celebrities singing songs while wearing head-to-toe costumes and face masks concealing their identities. It employs panelists who guess the celebrities' identities by interpreting clues provided to them throughout the series.

Production

Development 
In early January 2020, it was reported that TV Globo and SBT were in the running for the rights to produce The Masked Singer format in Brazil. The series was confirmed in April 2021 by Endemol Shine Brasil and would be produced by TV Globo and premiering on August 2021.

Hosts and panelists

Hosts
Singer Ivete Sangalo is the main host of the show in addition to serving as an executive producer. Camilla de Lucas served as backstage host and interviewer for season 1, with Priscilla Alcantara replacing her starting on season 2.
Key
 Main host
 Backstage

Panelists
The original panel consisted of comedian Eduardo Sterblitch, singer Simone Mendes, actor Rodrigo Lombardi and actress Taís Araújo. Comedian Tatá Werneck replaced Simone on season 2. TV host Sabrina Sato and actor Mateus Solano replaced Tatá and Rodrigo respectively on season 3.

Series overview

Ratings and reception

Brazilian ratings
All numbers are in points and provided by Kantar Ibope Media.

Spin-off
An online spin-off show Bate Papo The Masked Singer Brasil would air live immediately following the episodes on Gshow and Globoplay featuring exclusive content across social media sites and interviews hosted by Camila de Lucas with the eliminated celebrities and celebrity guests.

References

External links
 The Masked Singer Brasil Gshow.com

2021 Brazilian television series debuts
Brazilian reality television series
The Masked Singer Brasil
Portuguese-language television shows